The Sacred Heart Academy of Santa Maria Bulacan (commonly abbreviated as SHA) is a private, non-sectarian educational institution located in Santa Maria, Bulacan. Founded by "Ka Carling" in 1963. It is the oldest private education institution in Santa Maria, Bulacan.

History
The school was founded in 1963 by Ka Carling (Carlos Santos Sr.). The Institution was his bloodline, he pioneered the building of the first private secondary school in the town whose residents endured the hardships of commuting to nearby towns of Bulacan to acquire better education. The Institution as it is known was organized on February 15' 1963. first operated on July (of the said year) starting with a combined 244 students of first and second year high school, and after almost a year two more year levels were added. By the year 1973–74, Night Secondary Department was started with a total of 39 students. This was done to give the working youth a chance to pursue their secondary education. The construction of the NKED building was completed in 1982. More improvements were made in 1988. These were the School Canteen, Administrative Building, Library  and the Science Laboratory. In 1989, Computer Room was set up for the advancement in technology. and more improvements and new facilities was constructed as the time goes. The Academy has withstood the mushroomings of private schools in both elementary and secondary levels. Today, SHA stands proud as one of the biggest and most prestigious schools in Bulacan

External links 
 http://www.shabulacan.edu.ph/

Schools in Bulacan
Education in Santa Maria, Bulacan